Mary Heilmann is an American painter based in New York City and Bridgehampton, NY. She has had solo shows and travelling exhibitions at galleries such as 303 Gallery (NY, NY) and Hauser & Wirth (Zurich) and museums including the Wexner Center for the Arts (Columbus, OH) and the New Museum (NY, NY). Heilmann has been cited by many younger artists, particularly women, as an influential figure.

Early life and education
Heilmann was born in San Francisco, California, in 1940. In 1947 her family relocated to Los Angeles, California. While in Los Angeles she became a member of her local diving and swimming team, an activity that she would devote herself to until 1953 when her father died of cancer and the family moved back to San Francisco.  Upon returning Heilmann enrolled in a small Catholic school. As a high school student in late-1950s San Francisco she experienced the emergence of the Beat poetry and City Lights poetry scene.

In 1959 Heilmann started at the University of California, Santa Barbara. She recalled that it was “the beach, the surf, the surfers, the great shacky beach houses” that drew her there, an extension of the life she had made for herself in her late teens at San Francisco’s North Beach.  After graduating with a Bachelor's degree in literature, with an art minor, in 1962, Heilmann returned to San Francisco in 1963 to attend San Francisco State College (now San Francisco State University) in the hopes of earning a teaching credential.

While at SFSC she met the artist Ron Nagle and began studying ceramics in earnest, having dabbled in the medium while at UC Santa Barbara. In 1965 she began the Master’s program in ceramics and sculpture at the University of California, Berkeley, drawn as so many were to the modernist ceramicist Peter Voulkos.  While there she studied not only with Voulkos, but also with the sculptor and ceramicist Jim Melchert, and the painter and print-maker Karl Kasten. During her time at Berkeley Heilmann became friends with the artist Bruce Nauman, who was in school at University of California, Davis. Naumann introduced Heilmann to his teacher, the artist William T. Wiley who would also teach Heilmann for a short time.

Career

1960s 
Heilmann moved to New York City after graduating from Berkeley in 1968. She felt that both her interests and the work she was making (see Ooze, 1967) would find a kinship with shows like Dick Bellamy’s Arp to Artschwager Show at Noah Goldowski Gallery; Lucy Lippard’s Eccentric Abstraction at Fischbach Gallery; and the Primary Structures Show at the Jewish Museum. But such fellowship was not to be. Heilmann was excluded from a number of shows from that era, with 1969’s Anti-Illusion at the Whitney Museum of American Art being particularly crushing. It was this rejection that led Heilmann away from sculpture (see The Big Dipper, 1969) and towards painting. She chose not to embrace the Color Field painting of the moment, and instead produced what she has called a “materials-based sort of conceptual, anti-aesthetic, earth-colored, ironic painting that was often hard to look at.” Her move into painting saw her further experiment with new spontaneous and casual styles, techniques and mediums,  bright colors, drips, flatness, and unusual biomorphic geometries. These early paintings were, in her view, devoid of emotional content, possessed of a non-inflected, pure color. For Heilmann the goal was a painting that eschewed craft and seduction, and was instead “tough” and “plain.”

Heilmann places her work in the tradition of geometric painting—though she has also said that “abstraction” is a perfectly suitable term as well—and sees herself in conversation with Kazmir Malevich, Piet Mondrian, Josef Albers, and Ellsworth Kelly.

1970s 
One of Heilmann's earliest successes as a young painter was her 1972 inclusion in the Annual Exhibition at the Whitney Museum of American Art, where she exhibited a red monochrome piece entitled The Closet, also known as Ties in My Closet. Of her approach to painting, Heilmann said:When I make a painting, I’m like a kid stacking blocks; I push the shapes around in my mind, I count. It’s a way to begin. I was a potter first, and that’s an activity that also depends upon geometry, a round topological geometry of surfaces and spirals. Then I was a sculptor. I became a painter in the early ‘70s, but my orientation has always been that of someone who builds things.From 1976 until 1981 Heilmann was a regular in exhibitions at New York’s influential Holly Solomon Gallery, with two solo shows there during that time (1976’s The Vent Series and 1978’s New Paintings).In 1977 Heilmann moved to the neighborhood that is now known as TriBeCa (Triangle Below Canal), having previously lived in SoHo and Chinatown. But her time there was short, as Gordon Matta-Clark died in August 1978, this was a turning-point moment for Heilmann. The “family” that she had formed in New York City—including Matta-Clark, Norman Fisher (who died in 1977), Keith Sonnier, Liza Bear, Jackie Winsor, and Suzie Harris, among others—dispersed after Matta-Clark’s death. Heilmann returned to San Francisco. While there she would paint The End, an homage to her friendship with Matta-Clark and Fisher and a requiem for the life she once had in New York City. Heilmann said of this time in San Francisco:Now the work came from a different place. Instead of working out of the dogma of modernist, non-image formalism, I began to see that the choices in the work depended more on the content for their meaning. It was the end of modernism, and though I hadn’t heard the news, the beginning of postmodernism. It was a big minute for me. Everything would be different.Heilmann returned to New York in 1979, the same year she finished Save the Last Dance for Me, a painting that would go onto symbolize a break between the work she made before 1979 and the more mature work she produced after.

1980s 
However, Heilmann’s return coincided with what she felt was a sort of painting in exile. Having given up drugs and alcohol after Suzie Harris’s death, Heilmann no longer believed she had a place in New York’s Downtown scene. Though she would go on to make a number of artistic breakthroughs during this time, notably the painting Rosebud (1983). It was not until she met the gallerist Pat Hearn in 1986—and her subsequent representation by and show at the gallery later that year—that Heilmann recovered her sense of place in the New York City art world. With her involvement in the Pat Hearn Gallery and gallery-adjacent world Heilmann discovered a renewed connection to New York City and its Downtown scene. She became close with the artist Jack Pierson and the gallerist Tom Cugliani. Her first solo show with Pat Hearn was a success and led to more exhibitions in Europe and Japan. Heilmann was a part of the Downtown art world’s meteoric rise to respectability. Gone was the outlaw art world that she had felt so connected to. Hearn sold her 9th Street space and moved into a newer, larger one in SoHo. Heilmann went with her, but the artists Heilmann most favored did not: Philip Taffe, Peter Schuyff, and Milan Kunc.

1990s 
As the 1980s rolled into the 1990s Heilmann “abandoned” her picture of herself as an outsider, moving up the art world ranks with Pierson, Ross Bleckner and David Reed. Younger artists like Jessica Stockholder and Lari Pittman looked up to Heilmann. No longer longing to be “alienated,” she embraced that she had become part of the establishment, what she saw as a sort of return to her roots, a place of, as she called it, the “Catholic middle class of schoolteachers, engineers, cops, and nurses.” Since the 1990s Heilmann’s influence among a younger generation of painters has grown. The curator Elizabeth Armstrong observed that Heilmann has “played a significant role in the revival of painting, especially on the West Coast, where former students such Ingrid Calame, Laura Owens, and Monique Prieto were helping to reinvigorate painting for a new generation.” In 1995 Heilmann moved her studio out of her TriBeCa loft to a farm in the town of Bridgehampton on Long Island. With the purchase of the house and the subsequent shift away from the city, Heilmann’s work returned to its earlier emphasis on the importance water and the ocean, as was evident not only in the titles she chose for her paintings, but in her palette and use of wave imagery.

2000s
The 2000s have seen Heilmann return to her connection with ceramics, producing cups, plates, and saucers with the artist Steve Keister, thereby reincorporating the vessels into her practice. Further, starting in 2002 Heilmann expanded her interests and began making furniture, specifically the creation of simple yet vibrantly colorful chairs (plywood and nylon), what she calls “home arts.” Heilmann’s furniture making follows in the tradition of artists like Donald Judd and Franz West, however in having the chairs speak with and relate to the paintings Heilmann engages with them not merely as objects to be sat in but rather works of art installed in conversation with the paintings themselves. She said of her pairings: “I have designed the chairs to fit in sculpturally and pictorially with the look and feel of the rest of my work. Sometimes I even make a painting and a chair to work well together.”

Since the beginning of the 2000s Heilmann has seen an increased interest in her work with solo shows at Whitechapel Gallery in London, 303 Gallery in New York, and Hauser & Wirth in Zurich. She has received grants from the National Endowment for the Arts, the Guggenheim Foundation, and an Anonymous Was a Woman award in 2006. Perhaps most importantly, Heilmann was welcomed into the art historical canon with her 2007-2008 retrospective, To Be Someone. The show began at the Orange County Museum of Art in Newport Beach, CA and travelled to the Contemporary Arts Museum Houston, the Wexner Center for the Arts in Columbus, Ohio with its final stop at the New Museum in New York, NY. Writing in the New York Times the art critic Ken Johnson concluded that: “A part of Ms. Heilmann rebels against the elevation of fine art over the applied arts and resists the separation of art and life. The furniture and dishes reveal an expansive impulse to produce a holistic world…she continues to funnel her most ambitious energies into the concentrative art of painting and in doing so she achieves states of grace that are harder won than they look.”

Selected Solo and Two-Person Shows 
2022: Daydream 303 Gallery, New York

2021: Past Present Future, Hauser & Wirth, Zürich

2020: Highway, Oceans, Daydreams, Hauser & Wirth Southampton, NY

2018: Wavy: Sabra Moon Elliot and Mary Heilmann, Tripoli Gallery, Southampton, NY

       – Memory Remix, Hauser & Wirth, Los Angeles

2017: RYB: Mary Heilmann Paintings, 1975–78, Craig F. Starr Gallery, New York

       – Mary Heilmann: Painting Pictures, The Dan Flavin Art Institute, Bridgehampton, NY

2016: Mary Heilmann: Looking at Pictures, Whitechapel Gallery, London

2015: Geometrics: Waves, Roads, etc., 303 Gallery, New York

       – Sunset, Whitney Museum of American Art, New York

       – Two by Two: Mary Heilmann & David Reed, Hamburger Bahnhof - Museum für Gegenwart, Berlin
2013: Mary, Blinky, Yay! Mary Heilmann and Blinky Palermo in a Dialogue, Kunst Museum Bonn, Bonn

       – Mary Heilmann, Another Green World, Häusler Contemporary, Münich

2012: BACA 2012: Mary Heilmann: Good Vibrations, Bonnefantenmuseum, Maastricht, Netherlands; Neues Museum, Nuremberg, Germany (traveling exhibition)

       – Visions, Waves and Roads, Hauser & Wirth, London

       – Jacci Den Hartog + Mary Heilmann, The Suburban, Oak Park, IL

2010: Home Sweet Home, Galerie Barbara Weiss, Berlin

       – Weather Report: Drawings and Prints, Museum Ludwig, Cologne

2009: Two-Lane Blacktop, 303 Gallery, New York

2008: Some Pretty Colors, Zwirner & Wirth, New York

2007: Mary Heilmann: To Be Someone, organized by Orange County Museum of Art, Newport Beach, CA; Contemporary Arts Museum Houston, Houston; Wexner Center for the Arts, Columbus, OH; New Museum, New York (traveling exhibition)

2006: Saturday Night Kiss, Hauser & Wirth, Zürich

       – Mary Heilmann: New Etchings, Crown Point Gallery, San Francisco

2005: Heaven & Hell, 303 Gallery, New York
2004: Hauser & Wirth, London

2003: Mary Heilmann: All Tomorrow’s Parties, Secession, Vienna

       – Mary Heilmann: The Architecture of Heaven, Douglas Hyde Gallery, Trinity College, Dublin

2002: Mary Heilmann: New Paintings, American Fine Arts, New York

       – Mary Heilmann: Home, Kenny Schachter Gallery, New York

2001: Hauser & Wirth, Zürich

       – Mary Heilmann—Joanne Greenbaum, Greengrassi Gallery, London

       – Galerie Meyer Kainer, Vienna

       – Camden Arts Centre, London

2000: Mary Heilmann: Malerei, Oldenburger Kunstverein, Oldenburg, Germany; Galerie Vera Munroe, Hamburg

       – Jessica Stockholder—Mary Heilmann (Gemälde aus der Sammlung Hauser & Wirth), Kunstmuseum St. Gallen, St. Gall, Switzerland

1999: The All Night Movie, Hauser & Wirth, Zürich

1998: Mary Heilmann: Paintings, Pat Hearn Gallery, New York

       – Mary Heilmann: Selected Works, 1978–1998, Gallery of Art, Johnson County Community College, Overland Park, Kansas

1997: Richard Telles Gallery, Los Angeles

       – Mary Heilmann, This and That, Stiftung für konstruktive und konkrete Kunst, Zürich

       – Mary Heilmann: Paintings, 1973–1997, Hauser & Wirth, Zürich

       – Modern Art: Paintings and Papers, Wolfgang Häusler, Münich

       – Galerie Stadtpark, Krems, Austria

1995: New Works on Paper, Pat Hearn Gallery, New York

       – Zeno X Gallery, Antwerp

       – Mary Heilmann and Elizabeth Cannon, Christine Rose Gallery, New York

1994: Mary Heilmann: Paintings, Drawings, Ceramics, Beaver College Art Gallery, Glenside, Pennsylvania

       – Works, 1971–1994, M Gallery, Kunstvermittlung, Bochum, Germany

       – Greatest Hits, Pat Hearn Gallery, New York

       – Walter/McBean Gallery, San Francisco Art Institute, San Francisco

       – Mary Heilmann, Jene Highstein, Baumgartner Galleries, Washington, D.C.

1993: Pat Hearn Gallery, New York

1991: Pat Hearn Gallery, New York

       – Green Gallery, Bay Harbor Islands, Florida

1990: Mary Heilmann und Jessica Stockholder, Galerie Isabella Kacprzak, Cologne

       – Mary Heilmann: A Survey, Institute of Contemporary Art, Boston

       – Mary Heilmann: New Paintings, Fuller Gross Gallery, San Francisco

       – Robbin Lockett Gallery, Chicago

1989: Pat Hearn Gallery, New York

1988: Gallery Mukai, Tokyo

       – Pat Hearn Gallery, New York

       – Hillman Holland Gallery, Atlanta, GA

1986: Pat Hearn Gallery, New York
1983: Clocktower, New York

       – Daniel Weinberg Gallery, San Francisco

1981: Mary Heilmann: Recent Works, Holly Solomon Gallery, New York

       – Mary Heilmann: Ceramics, Holly Solomon Editions, New York

1980: Gemälde, Galerie Hans Strelow, Düsseldorf

1979: Galleri Wallner Fersens, Malmö, Sweden

       – Paintings, Holly Solomon Gallery, New York

       – Paintings and Drawings, Daniel Weinberg Gallery, San Francisco

1978: New Paintings, Holly Solomon Gallery, New York

1976: The Vent Series, Holly Solomon Gallery, New York

       – Holly Solomon Gallery, New York

1974: Curated by Lawrence Alloway, State University of New York, Stony Brook

1973: Henri Gallery, Washington, D.C.

1972: Paley & Lowe Gallery, New York

1971: Paley & Lowe Gallery, New York

1970: Whitney Museum Art Resource Center, New York

Selected Awards and Grants 
2017: American Academy of Arts and Letters, New York

2016: Academy of the Arts Lifetime Achievement Award in Visual Arts, Guild Hall of East Hampton, NY

2014: United States Artists Oliver Fellow

2012: Biennial Award for Contemporary Art, Bonnefanten Museum, Maastricht, Netherlands

       – Honorary Doctor of Fine Arts, University of Hartford, Hartford, CT

2009: College Art Association, Artist Award for Distinguished Body of Work

       – Artist of the Year, Rob Pruitt’s The First Annual Art Awards

2006: The Anonymous Was a Woman Foundation Award

1997: John Simon Guggenheim Memorial Foundation grant recipient

Public Collections

Corporate Collections 
Estee Lauder Co., Inc., New York

Island Records, New York

JPMorgan Chase, New York

Neuberger & Berman Collection, New York

The Progressive Corporation, Mayfield Village, Ohio

Aspen Re

Munich Re

Nordea Bank

Sparkasse Bank

Swiss Re

UBS

Museums 
AD&A Museum UC Santa Barbara, California

American University Museum at the Katzen Arts Center, Washington DC

Art Institute of Chicago, Illinois (promised)

Bowdoin College Museum of Art, Brunswick, Maine

Brooklyn Museum, New York

Cantor Arts Center at Stanford University, California

Cincinnati Art Museum, Ohio

Cleveland Museum of Art, Ohio

Dallas Museum of Art, Texas (promised)

de Young Fine Arts Museums, San Francisco, California

Hammer Museum, Los Angeles, California

High Museum of Art, Atlanta, Georgia

MIT List Visual Arts Center, Cambridge, Massachusetts

Museum of Contemporary Art, Chicago, Illinois

Museum of Contemporary Art Jacksonville, Florida

Museum of Modern Art, New York

National Academy Museum, New York

National Gallery of Art, Washington DC

National Gallery of Art, Corcoran Collection (Gift of the Friends of the Corcoran), Washington DC

Neuberger Museum of Art, Purchase, New York

Norton Museum of Art, West Palm Beach, Florida

Orange County Museum of Art, Newport Beach, California

Orlando Museum of Art, Florida

Parrish Art Museum, Southampton, New York

Pennsylvania Academy of the Fine Arts, Philadelphia

Racine Art Museum, Wisconsin

Rose Art Museum, Waltham, Massachusetts

San Diego Museum of Art, California

San Francisco Museum of Art, California

Smithsonian American Art Museum, Washington DC (promised)

Solomon R. Guggenheim Museum, New York

University of California Berkeley Art Museum, California

University of Alabama Gallery, Dinah Washington Cultural Arts Center, Alabama

Whitney Museum of American Art, New York

Bonnefanten Museum, Maastricht, Netherlands

Museum De Pont (De Pont Museum of Contemporary Art), Tilburg, Netherlands

Musée de Grenoble (The Museum of Grenoble), France

Museum Ludwig, Cologne, Germany

Neues Museum Nürnberg, Nuremberg, Germany

Secession, Vienna, Austria

Stedelijk Museum voor Actuele Kunst, Ghent, Belgium

Stiftung Museum Kunst Palast, Dusseldorf, Germany

Städel Museum, Frankfurt, Germany

References

Further reading
 Secession (ed.), 'Mary Heilmann. All Tomorrow’s Parties', Cologne: Verlag der Buchhandlung Walther König, 2003
 Armstrong, Elizabeth; Burton, Johanna; Hickey, David, 'Mary Heilmann. To Be Someone', New York NY: Prestel Publishing 2007 (exh. cat.)
 Myers, Terry, 'Mary Heilmann: Save the Last Dance for Me', Afterall Books, 2007
 Paula van den Bosch, Angelika Nollert (eds.), 'Mary Heilmann. Good Vibrations', Cologne: Verlag der Buchhandlung Walther König, 2012 (exh. cat.)
 Kienbaum, Jochen, 'Mary Heilmann. Seeing Things. Vision, Waves and Roads', Cologne/DE: Snoeck, 2012
 Schreier, Christoph, Gronert, Stefan (eds.), 'Mary Blinky Yay!', Cologne: Snoek Verlagsgesellschaft, 2013 (exh.cat.)

1940 births
Living people
American contemporary painters
Minimalist artists
20th-century American painters
21st-century American painters
Artists from San Francisco
20th-century American women artists
21st-century American women artists
American women painters
Members of the American Academy of Arts and Letters